Hydarnes (c. 6th century BC) was one of the seven Persian conspirators who overthrew the Pseudo-Smerdis.

Hydarnes (also spelled Idernes), a Greek transliteration of the Old Persian name Vidṛna, may also refer to:

 Hydarnes the Younger (c. 5th century BC), son of Hydarnes, and a commander under Xerxes I
 Hydarnes (father of Stateira), nobleman active during the reign of Darius II, and descendant (perhaps grandson) of Hydarnes the Younger